The Gloucester sea serpent is a creature reportedly seen around and off the coast of Gloucester, Massachusetts and Cape Ann area in the United States. The heyday of sightings began in August 1817 and continued into 1818–19. The earliest alleged sighting of such a creature off Cape Ann was recorded in 1638 by John Josselyn. Occasional sightings continued over the centuries and into the 20th century.

The spate of 1817 sightings caused the Linnaean Society of New England to investigate. General David Humphreys visited Gloucester and interviewed witnesses. The residents of Gloucester later located a small black snake on a beach with humps, which they believed was the offspring of the serpent. The Society's analysis was published in a pamphlet which announced it was a new species which they dubbed "Scoliophis Atlanticus". However, the specimen was examined by naturalist Charles Alexandre Lesueur who determined it was only a common Eastern racer with tumors on its spine.

Because hundreds, and possibly even thousands of people saw the creature, combined with the Linnaean Society's report, this serpent is one of the most well documented sea serpents ever.

Such attention has drawn the notice of those within the Cryptozoology community, including the field's founder, Bernard Heuvelmans. Heuvelmans outlined sightings of the creature in his book, In the Wake of the Sea-Serpents, originally titled, Le Grand Serpent-de-Mer.

Several witnesses had reported seeing a stinger or spear protruding from the head of the creature, which has led Joe Nickell to conclude that the creature is a narwhal.

  

Charleston playwright William Crafts lampooned the reports of the serpent in his play The sea serpent; or, Gloucester hoax: A dramatic jeu d'esprit, in three acts, published in 1819.

See also
 Thomas Handasyd Perkins#Gloucester Sea Serpent
 Linnaean Society of New England#Sea serpent

References

External links
 Report of a committee of the Linnaean Society of New England, relative to a large marine animal, supposed to be a serpent, seen near Cape Ann, Massachusetts, in August 1817, Linnaean Society of New England 
 Lore (podcast), A Deep Fear - Episode 59 (May 1, 2017)

Sea serpents
Monster
American legendary creatures
Gloucester, Massachusetts